The 1951 Campeonato Argentino de Rugby was won by the selection of Buenos Aires Province ("Provincia") that beat in the final the selection of Capital

Rugby Union in Argentina in 1951

National
 The "Championship of Buenos Aires" was shared by Club Universitario de Buenos Aires
 The "Cordoba Province Championship" was won by Jockey Club Córdoba
 The North-East Championship was shared by Universitario and Tucumán Rugby Club

International
 In November the Unión de Rugby del Río de la Plata (as was called before) change their name in "Unión Argentina de Rugby", as requested by the Argentina Olympic Committee .
 In September, was played the "Torneo Internacional ABCU", originally think as part of 1951 Pan American Games, played in February. But was no possible to arrange a tournament of rugby for those games, so it was arranged in September. The name "ABCU" was formed by the initial of nations participating. After the 1958 edition, this tournament was recognized as the first edition of the competition.

Tabellone

Knock out stages

Final 

 Provincia : H. Solveyra, E. Caffarone, A. Palma, J. L. Guidi, C. Arana, R. Giles, G. Ehrman, L. Allen, M. Sarandón, R. Ochoa, J. S. Morganti (Cap.), E. Domínguez, R. Follet, C. Swain, C. Travaglini.
 Capital: M. A. Miguel Villar, D. Evans, E. Fernández del Casal, R. Bazán, K. Green, I. Comas, P. Felisari, C. Bertolotto, H. Fiorioli, J. O'Farrell, J. Piccardo, C. Morea, M. Lanusse, F. Erazun, R. Pont Lezica.

Notes

Bibliography 
  Memorias de la UAR 1951
  VII Campeonato Argentino

Campeonato Argentino de Rugby
Argentina
Rugby